Roman Jebavý and Jan Šátral were the defending champions but lost in the first round to Lukáš Dlouhý and Andrej Martin.

Ariel Behar and Andrey Golubev won the title after defeating Lukáš Dlouhý and Andrej Martin 6–2, 5–7, [10–5] in the final.

Seeds

Draw

References
 Main Draw

Poprad-Tatry ATP Challenger Tour - Doubles
2016 Doubles